Gonzalo Jara may refer to:

Gonzalo Jara (footballer, born 1985), Chilean footballer
Gonzalo Jara (footballer, born 1998), Chilean footballer